CIFE may refer to:
Centre International de Formation Européenne, an international organisation which promotes European studies
Central Institute of Fisheries Education, an institution of higher learning in India
Conference for Independent Further Education (now CIFE – the Council for Independent Education), an association of UK independent colleges
criminal investigative files exemption